Spain and Portugal 2018 was an official joint Iberian bid for the right to host the 2018 FIFA World Cup. The International Federation of Football Association (FIFA) invited its member associations to bid for either the 2018 or the 2022 final tournaments, or both. The Portuguese Football Federation (FPF) and the Royal Spanish Football Federation (RFEF) submitted together a bid for both editions, but with the focus on winning the privilege to host the 2018 finals. Due to the withdrawal of all non-European bids for the 2018 edition, the Spanish-Portuguese bid, and that of all other European bidding nations, were effectively considered ineligible for the 2022 campaign.

On December 2, 2010, after a vote of the FIFA Executive Committee at its headquarters in Zürich, the Iberian bid lost the 2018 hosting rights to Russia, in a two-round voting, collecting seven votes against Russian's thirteen in the final round.

Schedule

Details
Eighteen venues across sixteen cities in Spain made the final bid package as potential host venues for the tournament. In Portugal, only the two most populous cities - Lisbon (2 venues) and Porto - earned a place in the final bid package. In all likelihood, based on the assumption that FIFA allows twelve venues for the tournament, nine venues would be allocated to Spain and the remaining three would go to Portugal.

Potential venues

Submitted bid venues
The following are the 21 venues that were submitted to FIFA on 14 May 2010 as part of the FPF–RFEF's bid to host the 2018/2022 FIFA World Cup:

a: Stadium/site used in the 1982 FIFA World Cup.
b: Stadium/site used in the UEFA Euro 2004.

Rejected bid venues
The following is a list of stadiums that were considered at one time as part of the FPF–RFEF's bid to host the 2018/2022 FIFA World Cup, but did not make the final cut:

References

External links
 Official website
 facebook page

Portugal–Spain
bid
FIFA World Cup Bid
bid
Portugal–Spain relations